Lajpatpura is a town near Sagar in Madhya Pradesh state in India.

Cities and towns in Sagar district